The 2014 Indian general election in Goa was held on 17 April 2014.

Results

|- align=center
!style="background-color:#E9E9E9" class="unsortable"|
!style="background-color:#E9E9E9" align=center|Political Party
!style="background-color:#E9E9E9" |Seats won
!style="background-color:#E9E9E9" |Seat change
|-
| 
|align="left"|Bharatiya Janata Party||2|| 1
|-
| 
|align="left"|Indian National Congress||0|| 1
|-
|
|align="left"|Total||2||
|}

List of elected MPs

Source:

References

Indian general elections in Goa
2010s in Goa
2014 Indian general election by state or union territory